Sharkawshchyna District is a second-level administrative subdivision (raion) of Belarus in the Vitebsk Region. The administrative center is the town of Sharkawshchyna.

Notable residents 

 Helen Michaluk (born 1930), prominent figure of the Belarusian diaspora who was a long-standing (and the only female) head of the Association of Belarusians in Great Britain.

References

 
Districts of Vitebsk Region